The 2024 United Nations Security Council election will be held in mid-2024 during the 78th session of the United Nations General Assembly, held at United Nations Headquarters in New York City. The elections are for five non-permanent seats on the UN Security Council for two-year mandates commencing on 1 January 2025.
In accordance with the Security Council's rotation rules, whereby the ten non-permanent UNSC seats rotate among the various regional blocs into which UN member states traditionally divide themselves for voting and representation purposes, the five available seats are allocated as follows:

One for Africa
One for the Asia-Pacific Group
One for Latin America and the Caribbean
Two for the Western European and Others Group

The five members will serve on the Security Council for the 2025–26 period.

Candidates

Africa Group

Asia-Pacific Group

Western Europe and Others Group

See also
List of members of the United Nations Security Council

References

2024 elections
2024
Non-partisan elections